Rob Saunders (born 5 August 1968 in Nottingham) is a former Irish rugby union international player who played as a scrum-half.
He played for the Ireland team from 1991 to 1994, winning 12 caps. He was a member of the Ireland squad at the 1991 Rugby World Cup.

References 

1968 births
Living people
Irish rugby union players
Ireland international rugby union players
Irish Exiles rugby union players
Rugby union scrum-halves